Abu Bakkar Siddiq (born 15 October 1993) is a Bangladeshi first-class cricketer. He is a left-handed batsman and slow left-arm orthodox bowler. He was selected to play for Dhaka Metropolis in the 2013-14 National Cricket League. Then he represented Khulna Division from 2014 to 2016 in first-class cricket. He made his first-class debut for Dhaka Metropolis in January 2014 during the 2013-14 National Cricket League, in which he scored 33 runs off 82 balls in the first innings and 32 runs off 54 balls in the second innings.

References

External links 

Dhaka Metropolis cricketers
Khulna Division cricketers
Bangladeshi cricketers
Living people
1993 births
People from Kushtia District